The 2011 Star Mazda Championship was the 13th Star Mazda Championship season, the second under the Mazda Road to Indy program, and the first under IndyCar sanctioning, after 12 years under the International Motor Sports Association umbrella. As part of the program's expansion, the series champion will be provided a scholarship to advance into Firestone Indy Lights for the 2012 season. The season will feature 11 races over 10 weekends, with four road courses, three street circuits and three ovals on the schedule.

The series consisted of a main championship as well as an Expert championship for drivers over 30 years of age, combining previous years' Expert and Masters championships.

JDC MotorSports' Tristan Vautier won four races on his way to the championship by a 25-point margin over Connor De Phillippi, who also won four races. Vautier finished in the top five in every race. Andretti Autosport rookie Sage Karam also won two oval races and captured Rookie of The Year honors. J. W. Roberts won the Expert Championship when closest rival Walt Bowlin did not enter the final race of the season. The team championship went to Team Pelfrey which fielded cars for De Phllippi and Nick Andries, who finished third in points.

Drivers and teams

Race calendar and results
The race schedule was announced on December 20, 2010.

Championship standings

Drivers'

1Larry Pegram was not registered for the championship at St. Pete and not eligible for points.

Teams'

References

External links
 Star Mazda Championship Official website

Star Mazda Championship
Indy Pro 2000 Championship